Approximately 2,000 athletes, coaches, team staff and officials participated in the 2006 Arctic Winter Games on the Kenai Peninsula, Alaska in the United States. The 2006 games took place from March 5 through March 11. Events were held mostly in the larger towns of Soldotna and Kenai, along with Homer (curling) and the Alyeska Ski Resort in Girdwood (alpine skiing and snowboarding). Soldotna, Kenai, Homer, and the town of Seward also hosted cultural events. This was the fifth time Alaska had hosted the games.

Participants
 Alaska (host contingent)
 Greenland
 Northwest Territories
 Nunavik Quebec (traditionally defined Northern Inuit region of the Nord-du-Québec administrative region in Quebec)
 Nunavut
 Northern Alberta
 Russia (because only the Yamalo-Nenets Autonomous Okrug participated they were referred to as team Russia, competing under the Russian flag)
 Sami (Sami peoples of Norway, Sweden, and Finland collectively)
 Yukon Territory

The 2008 Arctic Winter Games were held in Yellowknife, Northwest Territories.

Events
Competition was held in alpine skiing, badminton, basketball, biathlon, cross-country skiing, curling, Dene games (see Dene), dog mushing, figure skating, gymnastics, ice hockey, indoor soccer, Inuit games (see Inuit), short track speed skating, snowboarding, snowshoe biathlon, snowshoeing (see Snowshoe), speed skating, table tennis, volleyball, and wrestling.

2006 medal tally
(Unofficially listed with number of gold medals taking priority followed by silvers.)

External links
 2006 Official Site
 Arctic Winter Games Official Site
 ESPN Article

Arctic Winter Games
Arctic Winter Games
Arctic Winter Games
Arctic Winter Games
Arctic Winter Games
Sports competitions in Alaska
Winter multi-sport events in the United States